Easy Rider is a 1969 American independent road drama film written by Peter Fonda, Dennis Hopper, and Terry Southern, produced by Fonda, and directed by Hopper. Fonda and Hopper play two bikers who travel through the American Southwest and South, carrying the proceeds from a cocaine deal. The success of Easy Rider helped spark the New Hollywood era of filmmaking during the early 1970s.

A landmark counterculture film, and a "touchstone for a generation" that "captured the national imagination," Easy Rider explores the societal landscape, issues, and tensions towards adolescents in the United States during the 1960s, such as the rise of the hippie movement, drug use, and communal lifestyle. Real drugs were used in scenes showing the use of marijuana and other substances.

Released by Columbia Pictures on July 14, 1969, Easy Rider earned $60 million worldwide from a modest filming budget of $400,000. Critics have praised the performances, directing, writing, soundtrack, and visuals. It received two Academy Awards nominations for Best Original Screenplay and Best Supporting Actor (Jack Nicholson). 

In 1998, the film was selected for preservation in the United States National Film Registry by the Library of Congress as being "culturally, historically, or aesthetically significant".

Plot

Wyatt and Billy are freewheeling motorcyclists. After smuggling cocaine from Mexico to Los Angeles, they sell their haul and receive a large sum of money. With the cash stuffed into a plastic tube hidden inside the Stars & Stripes-painted fuel tank of Wyatt's California-style chopper, they ride eastward aiming to reach New Orleans, Louisiana, in time for the Mardi Gras festival.

During their trip, Wyatt and Billy stop to repair a flat tire on Wyatt's bike at a farmstead in Arizona and have a meal with the farmer and his family. Later, Wyatt picks up a hippie hitch-hiker, and he invites them to visit his commune, where they stay for the rest of the day. The notion of "free love" appears to be practiced, with two of the women, Lisa and Sarah, seemingly sharing the affections of the hitch-hiking commune member before turning their attention to Wyatt and Billy. As the bikers leave, the hitch-hiker gives Wyatt some LSD for him to share with "the right people".

Later, while riding along with a parade in New Mexico, the pair are arrested for "parading without a permit" and thrown in jail. There, they befriend lawyer George Hanson, who has spent the night in jail after overindulging in alcohol. After the mention of having done work for the ACLU along with other conversation, George helps them get out of jail and decides to travel with Wyatt and Billy to New Orleans. As they camp that night, Wyatt and Billy introduce George to marijuana. As an alcoholic and a "square", George is reluctant to try it due to his fear of becoming "hooked" and it leading to worse drugs but quickly relents.

Stopping to eat at a small-town Louisiana diner, the trio attracts the attention of the locals. The girls in the restaurant think they are exciting, but the local men and a police officer make denigrating comments and taunts. Wyatt, Billy, and George decide to leave without any fuss. They make camp outside town. In the middle of the night, a group of locals attack the sleeping trio, beating them with clubs. Billy screams and brandishes a knife, and the attackers leave. Wyatt and Billy suffer minor injuries, but George has been bludgeoned to death. Wyatt and Billy wrap George's body in his sleeping bag, gather his belongings, and vow to return the items to his family.

They continue to New Orleans and find a brothel George had told them about. Taking prostitutes Karen and Mary with them, Wyatt and Billy wander the parade-filled streets of the Mardi Gras celebration. They end up in a French Quarter cemetery, where all four ingest the LSD the hitch-hiker had given to Wyatt.

The next morning, as they are overtaken on a two-lane country road by two local men in an older pickup truck, the passenger in the truck reaches for a shotgun, saying he will scare them. As they pass Billy, the passenger fires, and Billy has a lowside crash. The truck passes Wyatt who has stopped, and Wyatt rides back to Billy, finding him lying flat on the side of the road and covered in blood. Wyatt tells Billy he's going to get help and covers Billy's wound with his own leather jacket. Wyatt then rides down the road toward the pickup as it makes a U-turn. Passing in the opposite direction, the passenger fires the shotgun again, this time through the driver's-side window. Wyatt's riderless motorcycle flies through the air and comes apart before landing and becoming engulfed in flames.

Cast

 Peter Fonda as Wyatt, "Captain America"
 Dennis Hopper as Billy
 Jack Nicholson as George Hanson
 Luke Askew as Stranger on Highway
 Phil Spector as Connection
 Karen Black as Karen
 Toni Basil as Mary
 Antonio Mendoza as Jesus
 Mac Mashourian as Bodyguard
 Warren Finnerty as Rancher
 Tita Colorado as Rancher's Wife
 Luana Anders as Lisa
 Sabrina Scharf as Sarah
 Robert Walker Jr. as Jack
 Sandy Brown Wyeth as Joanne

Among those uncredited in the commune scene were Bridget Fonda, Dan Haggerty, and Carrie Snodgress.

Production

Writing
Hopper and Fonda's first collaboration was in The Trip (1967), written by Jack Nicholson, which had themes and characters similar to those of Easy Rider. Peter Fonda had become "an icon of the counterculture" in The Wild Angels (1966), where he established "a persona he would develop further in The Trip and Easy Rider." The Trip also popularized LSD, while Easy Rider went on to "celebrate '60s counterculture" but does so "stripped of its innocence." Author Katie Mills wrote that The Trip is a way point along the "metamorphosis of the rebel road story from a Beat relic into its hippie reincarnation as Easy Rider", and connected Peter Fonda's characters in those two films, along with his character in The Wild Angels, deviating from the "formulaic biker" persona and critiquing "commodity-oriented filmmakers appropriating avant-garde film techniques." It was also a step in the transition from independent film into Hollywood's mainstream, and while The Trip was criticized as a faux, popularized underground film made by Hollywood insiders, Easy Rider "interrogates" the attitude that underground film must "remain strictly segregated from Hollywood." Mills also wrote that the famous acid trip scene in Easy Rider "clearly derives from their first tentative explorations as filmmakers in The Trip." The Trip and The Wild Angels had been low-budget films released by American International Pictures and were both successful. When Fonda took Easy Rider to AIP, however, as it was Hopper's first film as director, they wanted to be able to replace him if the film went overbudget, so Fonda took the film to Bert Schneider of Raybert Productions and Columbia Pictures instead.

When seeing a still of himself and Bruce Dern in The Wild Angels, Peter Fonda had the idea of a modern Western, involving two bikers travelling around the country and eventually getting shot by hillbillies. He called Dennis Hopper, and the two decided to turn that into a movie, The Loners, with Hopper directing, Fonda producing, and both starring and writing. They brought in screenwriter Terry Southern, who came up with the title Easy Rider. The film was mostly shot without a screenplay, with ad-libbed lines, and production started with only the outline and the names of the protagonists. Keeping the Western theme, Wyatt was named after Wyatt Earp and Billy after Billy the Kid. However, Southern disputed that Hopper wrote much of the script. In an interview published in 2016 [Southern died in 1995] he said, "You know if Den Hopper improvises a dozen lines and six of them survive the cutting room floor he'll put in for screenplay credit. Now it would be almost impossible to exaggerate his contribution to the film—but, by George, he manages to do it every time." According to Southern, Fonda was under contract to produce a motorcycle film with A.I.P., which Fonda had agreed to allow Hopper to direct. According to Southern, Fonda and Hopper didn't seek screenplay credit until after the first screenings of the film, which required Southern's agreement due to writers guild policies. Southern says he agreed out of a sense of camaraderie, and that Hopper later took credit for the entire script.

According to Terry Southern's biographer, Lee Hill, the part of George Hanson had been written for Southern's friend, actor Rip Torn. When Torn met with Hopper and Fonda at a New York restaurant in early 1968 to discuss the role, Hopper began ranting about the "rednecks" he had encountered on his scouting trip to the South. Torn, a Texan, took exception to some of Hopper's remarks, and the two almost came to blows, as a result of which Torn withdrew from the project. Torn was replaced by Jack Nicholson, whom Hopper had recently appeared with in Head (along with another Easy Rider co-star, Toni Basil). In 1994, Jay Leno interviewed Hopper about Easy Rider on The Tonight Show, and during the interview, Hopper falsely claimed that Torn had pulled a knife on him during the altercation when it was actually the other way around. This infuriated Torn, so he sued Hopper for defamation seeking punitive damages. Torn ultimately prevailed against Hopper on all counts.

Filming
The filming budget of Easy Rider was $360,000 to $400,000. Peter Fonda said that on top of this, he personally paid for the costs of travel and lodging for the crew, saying, "Everybody was taking my credit cards and would pay for all the hotels, the food, the gas, everything with Diner's Club". Laszlo Kovacs said that an additional $1 million, "about three times the budget for shooting the rest of the film" was spent licensing music that was added during the editing.

According to Bill Hayward, the associate producer of the film, in interviews included as part of the bonus DVD feature, Shaking the Cage, Hopper was difficult on set. During test shooting on location in New Orleans, Hopper fought with the production's ad hoc crew for control. At one point he entered into a physical confrontation with photographer Barry Feinstein, who was one of the camera operators for the shoot. After this turmoil, Hopper and Fonda decided to assemble a proper crew for the rest of the film.

The hippie commune was recreated from pictures and shot at a site overlooking Malibu Canyon, since the New Buffalo commune in Arroyo Hondo near Taos, New Mexico, did not permit shooting there.

A short clip near the beginning of the film shows Wyatt and Billy on Route 66 in Flagstaff, Arizona, passing a large figure of a lumberjack. That lumberjack statue — once situated in front of the Lumberjack Café — remains in Flagstaff, but now stands inside the J. Lawrence Walkup Skydome on the campus of Northern Arizona University. A second, very similar statue was also moved from the Lumberjack Café to the exterior of the Skydome.

Most of the film is shot outside with natural lighting. Hopper said all the outdoor shooting was an intentional choice on his part, because "God is a great gaffer." The production used two five-ton trucks, one for the equipment and one for the motorcycles, with the cast and crew in a motor home. One of the locations was Monument Valley.

The restaurant scenes with Fonda, Hopper, and Nicholson were shot in Morganza, Louisiana. The men and girls in that scene were all Morganza locals. In order to inspire more vitriolic commentary from the local men, Hopper told them the characters of Billy, Wyatt, and George had raped and killed a girl outside of town. The scene in which Billy and Wyatt were shot was filmed on Louisiana Highway 105 North, just outside Krotz Springs, and the two other men in the scene—Johnny David and D.C. Billodeau—were Krotz Springs locals.

While shooting the cemetery scene, Hopper tried to convince Fonda to talk to the statue of the Madonna as though it were Fonda's mother (who had committed suicide when he was 10 years old) and ask her why she left him. Although Fonda was reluctant, he eventually complied. Later Fonda used the inclusion of this scene, along with the concluding scene, as leverage to persuade Bob Dylan to allow the use of  Roger McGuinn's  cover of "It's Alright, Ma (I'm Only Bleeding).

Post-production
Despite being filmed in the first half of 1968, roughly between Mardi Gras and the assassination of Robert F. Kennedy, with production starting on February 22, the film did not have a U.S. premiere until July 1969, after having won an award at the Cannes film festival in May. The delay was partially due to a protracted editing process. Inspired by 2001: A Space Odyssey, one of Hopper's proposed cuts was 220 minutes long, including extensive use of the "flash-forward" narrative device, wherein scenes from later in the movie are inserted into the current scene. Only one flash-forward survives in the final edit: when Wyatt in the New Orleans brothel has a premonition of the final scene. At the request of Bob Rafelson and Bert Schneider, Henry Jaglom was brought in to edit the film into its current form, while Schneider purchased a trip to Taos for Hopper so he wouldn't interfere with the recut. Upon seeing the final cut, Hopper was originally displeased, saying that his movie was "turned into a TV show," but he eventually accepted, claiming that Jaglom had crafted the film the way Hopper had originally intended. Despite the large part he played in shaping the film, Jaglom only received credit as an "Editorial Consultant."

It is unclear what the exact running time of original rough cut of the movie was: four hours, four and a half hours, or five hours. In 1992 the film's producers, Schneider and Rafelson, sued Columbia Pictures over missing negatives, edit footage and damaged prints holding them negligent concerning these assets. Some of the scenes which were in the original cut but were deleted are:
 The original opening showing Wyatt and Billy performing in a Los Angeles stunt show (their real jobs)
 Wyatt and Billy being ripped off by the promoter
 Wyatt and Billy getting in a biker fight
 Wyatt and Billy picking up women at a drive-in
 Wyatt and Billy cruising to and escaping from Mexico to score the cocaine they sell
 An elaborate police and helicopter chase that took place at the beginning after the dope deal with police chasing Wyatt and Billy over mountains and across the Mexican border
 The road trip out of L.A. edited to the full length of Steppenwolf's "Born to Be Wild" with billboards along the way offering wry commentary
 Wyatt and Billy being pulled over by a cop while riding their motorcycles across a highway
 Wyatt and Billy encountering a black motorcycle gang
 Ten additional minutes for the volatile café scene in Louisiana where George deftly keeps the peace
 Wyatt and Billy checking into a hotel before going over to Madam Tinkertoy's
 An extended and much longer Madam Tinkertoy sequence
 Extended versions of all the campfire scenes, including the enigmatic finale in which Wyatt says, "We blew it, Billy."

Easy Riders style — the jump cuts, time shifts, flash forwards, flashbacks, jerky hand-held cameras, fractured narrative and improvised acting — can be seen as a cinematic translation of the psychedelic experience. Peter Biskind, author of Easy Riders, Raging Bulls wrote: "LSD did create a frame of mind that fractured experience and that LSD experience had an effect on films like Easy Rider."

Motorcycles

While Easy Rider is famous for the Harley-Davidson choppers, the movie actually begins with the characters riding two European-made dirt bikes, Fonda on a red Bultaco Pursang, Hopper on Norton P11 Ranger. In total, two dirt bikes, and four former police bikes were used in the film. Each bike had a backup to make sure that shooting could continue in case one of the old machines failed or got wrecked accidentally. The main motorcycles for the film, based on hardtail frames and panhead engines, were designed and built by two chopper builders — Cliff Vaughs and Ben Hardy — following ideas of Peter Fonda, and handled by Tex Hall and Dan Haggerty during shooting.

One "Captain America" was demolished in the final scene, while the other three were stolen and probably taken apart before their significance as movie props became known. The demolished bike was rebuilt by Dan Haggerty and offered for auction in October 2014 by Profiles in History, a Calabasas, California-based auction house with an estimated value of $1–1.2 million. The provenance of existing Captain America motorcycles is unclear, and has been the subject of much litigation. The EMP Museum in Seattle identified a Captain America chopper displayed there as a rebuilt original movie prop. Many replicas have been made since the film's release, including examples at the Deutsches Zweirad- und NSU-Museum (Germany), National Motorcycle Museum (Iowa), Barber Vintage Motorsports Museum (Alabama), and Harley-Davidson Museum (Milwaukee).

Hopper and Fonda hosted a wrap party for the movie and then realized they had not yet shot the final campfire scene. Thus, it was shot after the bikes had already been stolen, which is why they are not visible in the background as in the other campfire scenes.

Reception

Critical reception
The film received mostly positive reviews from critics. Vincent Canby of The New York Times called it "pretty but lower case cinema" despite the "upper case" "pious statement about our society which is sick". He was mildly impressed by the photography, rock score and Nicholson's performance. Penelope Gilliatt in The New Yorker said that it "speaks tersely and aptly for this American age, that is both the best of times and the worst of times."

Roger Ebert added Easy Rider to his "Great Movies" list in 2004. Easy Rider holds a "Certified Fresh" 84% rating on Rotten Tomatoes based on 55 reviews. The site's consensus states: "Edgy and seminal, Easy Rider encapsulates the dreams, hopes, and hopelessness of 1960s counterculture."

Box office
The film opened on July 14, 1969, at the Beekman theater in New York City and grossed a house record of $40,422 in its first week. It grossed even more the following week with $46,609. In its fourteenth week of release, it was the number one film at the U.S. box office and remained there for three weeks. It was the fourth highest-grossing film of 1969, with a worldwide gross of $60 million, including $41.7 million domestically in the U.S. and Canada.

Accolades

In 1998, Easy Rider was added to the United States National Film Registry, having been deemed "culturally, historically, or aesthetically significant."

In April 2019, a restored version of the film was selected to be shown in the Cannes Classics section at the 2019 Cannes Film Festival.American Film Institute Lists AFI's 100 Years...100 Movies – #88

Significance
Along with Bonnie and Clyde and The Graduate, Easy Rider helped kick-start the New Hollywood era during the late 1960s and 1970s. The major studios realized that money could be made from low-budget films made by avant-garde directors. Heavily influenced by the French New Wave, the films of the so-called "post-classical Hollywood" came to represent a counterculture generation increasingly disillusioned with its government as well as the government's effects on the world at large and the establishment in general. Although Jack Nicholson appears only as a supporting actor and in the last half of the film, the standout performance signaled his arrival as a movie star, along with his subsequent film Five Easy Pieces in which he had the lead role. Vice President Spiro Agnew criticized Easy Rider, along with the band Jefferson Airplane, as examples of the permissiveness of the 1960s counterculture.

The film's success, and the new era of Hollywood that it helped usher in, gave Hopper the chance to direct again with complete artistic control. The result was 1971's The Last Movie, which was a notable box office and critical failure, effectively ending Hopper's career as a director for well over a decade.

It also gave Fonda the chance to direct with The Hired Hand although he rarely produced again.

Music

The movie's "groundbreaking" soundtrack featured popular rock artists including The Band, The Byrds, The Jimi Hendrix Experience and Steppenwolf. Editor Donn Cambern used various music from his own record collection to make watching hours of bike footage more interesting during editing. Most of Cambern's music was used, with licensing costs of $1 million, triple the film's budget. The film's extensive use of pop and rock music for the soundtrack was similar to what had recently been used for 1967's The Graduate.

Bob Dylan was asked to contribute music, but was reluctant to use his own recording of "It's Alright, Ma (I'm Only Bleeding)", so a version performed by Byrds frontman Roger McGuinn was used instead. Also, instead of writing an entirely new song for the film, Dylan simply wrote out the first verse of "Ballad of Easy Rider" and told the filmmakers, "Give this to McGuinn, he'll know what to do with it." McGuinn completed the song and performed it in the film.

Originally, Peter Fonda had intended the band Crosby, Stills, Nash, & Young to write an entirely original soundtrack for the film, but this failed to materialize for two reasons. For one, cutter Donn Cambern edited the footage much more closely to what were only meant as temporary tracks than was customary at the time, which led to everyone involved finding them much more suited to the material than they had originally thought. Also, upon watching a screening of the film with Cambern's edits, the group felt they could not improve on the music that was used. On the other hand, Hopper increasingly got control over every aspect over the course of the project and decided to throw CSNY out behind Fonda's back, telling the band as an excuse, "Look, you guys are really good musicians, but honestly, anybody who rides in a limo can't comprehend my movie, so I'm gonna have to say no to this, and if you guys try to get in the studio again, I may have to cause you some bodily harm."

Inspired by the movie, Hendrix later wrote a song "Ezy Ryder", with lyrics reflecting the film's themes.

Home media
The film was released by The Criterion Collection in November 2010 as part of the box set America Lost and Found: The BBS Story. It included two audio commentaries, one featuring actor-director-writer Dennis Hopper, the other with Hopper, actor-writer Peter Fonda, and production manager Paul Lewis; two documentaries about the making and history of the film, Born to Be Wild (1995) and Easy Rider: Shaking the Cage (1999); television excerpts showing Hopper and Fonda at the Cannes Film Festival; and a new video interview with BBS co-founder Stephen Blauner.

Sequel
In 2012, a sequel to the movie was released titled Easy Rider: The Ride Back, directed by Dustin Rikert. The film is about the family of Wyatt "Captain America" Williams from the 1940s to the present day. No members of the original cast or crew were involved with the film, which was produced and written by amateur filmmaker Phil Pitzer, who had purchased the sequel rights to Easy Rider. Pitzer also pursued legal action against Bob Rafelson and Bert Schneider in order to block them from reclaiming the rights to the film.

See also
 List of American films of 1969
 List of films featuring hallucinogens
 American Dream
 Hippie exploitation films
 Method acting
 Outlaw biker film
 List of films related to the hippie subculture

ReferencesBibliography 
 
 Easy Rider Bibliography (via UC Berkeley)
 
 Hoberman, J. Criterion Collection Essay
 
 
 Phipps, Keith. (November 16, 2009) Slate.com. The Easy Rider Road Trip: Retracing the Path of the Iconic Movie on Its 40th Anniversary
 Zoller Seitz, Matt. Criterion Collection EssayFurther reading'''
 

External links

 
 
 
 
 Easy Rider essay on the National Film Registry site by William Wolf
 Easy Rider'' essay by Daniel Eagan in America's Film Legacy: The Authoritative Guide to the Landmark Movies in the National Film Registry, A&C Black, 2010 , pp. 649–651 
 
 "Easy Rider: Wild at Heart", an essay by Matt Zoller Seitz at the Criterion Collection

1969 films
1969 drama films
1960s drama road movies
American drama road movies
Columbia Pictures films
1960s English-language films
Films about hallucinogens
Films about the illegal drug trade
Films directed by Dennis Hopper
Films set in Arizona
Films set in California
Films set in Louisiana
Films set in New Mexico
Films set in New Orleans
Films set in Texas
Films shot in Arizona
Films shot in California
Films shot in Louisiana
Films shot in Malibu, California
Films shot in New Mexico
Films shot in New Orleans
Films shot in Utah
Films set in Malibu, California
Films set in Utah
Hippie films
Motorcycling films
Outlaw biker films
Psychedelic films
Films with screenplays by Dennis Hopper
Films with screenplays by Terry Southern
United States National Film Registry films
1969 directorial debut films
1960s American films
Films shot in Monument Valley